Benonine is an unincorporated community in Wheeler County, in the U.S. state of Texas.  It is just to the west of the Oklahoma/Texas border, on Interstate 40.

History
Benonine was platted in 1909 when the Chicago, Rock Island and Gulf Railway was extended to that point. The community derives its name from the Benonine Oil and Gas Company.

References

Unincorporated communities in Wheeler County, Texas
Unincorporated communities in Texas